Established in 1976, Fundação Dom Cabral (FDC) is a Brazilian business school. FDC, a nonprofit institution, was created out of the Extension Center at the Pontifical Catholic University of Minas Gerais. Approximately 40,000 executives from midsize to large companies attend FDC programs every year – in the cities of Nova Lima, Belo Horizonte, São Paulo, and Rio de Janeiro.

FDC has strategic alliances with foreign teaching institutions such as INSEAD and Skema Business School in France and the Kellogg School of Management at Northwestern University in the U.S. FDC also has cooperative partnerships with schools in Brazil, Argentina, Colombia, Chile, China, India, Mexico, Peru, Portugal, Russia, Spain, and the United Kingdom.

Timeline
1976 - Fundação Dom Cabral was founded.1989 – Creation of the first partnership program: CTE – Executive Technology Center1990 – Alliance with INSEAD (France) to develop open enrollment programs for senior executives working in Brazil1992 – Creation of PAEX – Partners for Excellence, a partnership program for middle-sized companies1993 – Alliance with Kellogg School of Management - Northwestern University (USA) to develop an open enrollment program for leaders of companies operating in Brazil1996 – Launching of the MBA Empresarial an executive MBA program in consortium1999 – Creation of PDA – a partnership for the development of family business shareholders 2001 – Inauguration of the FDC Aloysio Farias Campus located in the city of Nova Lima, 30 km south of Belo Horizonte 2002 – Alliance with Sauder School of Business (Canada) to develop programs for high potential managers and programs on specific subjects including a program in China2004 – Fundação Dom Cabral joined the UN Global Compact, pledging to insert its principles into the institution’s decisions and to collaborate in spreading business practices expressing the values of sustainable development.2005 - Accreditation of the MBA programs by AMBA (Association of MBAs).2007 - Received the EQUIS (EFMD) accreditation.2012 - Signed a partnership with Hult International Business School to become the host of their global campus rotation program.

2015 - Signed a partnership with Skema Business School to become the host of Skema's Grande École program

References

External links 

Business schools in Brazil
Educational institutions established in 1976
1976 establishments in Brazil